Murayama Station is the name of two train stations in Japan:

 Murayama Station (Nagano)
 Murayama Station (Yamagata)